Government General Degree College, Kharagpur-II, also known as Madpur College, established in 2015, is the government degree college in Paschim Medinipur district. It offers undergraduate courses in arts and science. It is affiliated to Vidyasagar University.

Departments

Arts
Bengali
English
History
Philosophy
Political Science

Science
Physics
Chemistry
Mathematics
Botany
Zoology
Physiology

See also

References

External links
 http://www.ambigeriagovtcollege.org/

Universities and colleges in Paschim Medinipur district
Colleges affiliated to Vidyasagar University
Educational institutions established in 2015
2015 establishments in West Bengal
Government colleges in West Bengal